Meadow Branch is a  long 3rd order tributary to Little Creek in Sussex County, Delaware.  Meadow Branch forms Little Creek along with Holly Branch.

Variant names
According to the Geographic Names Information System, it has also been known historically as:
Little Creek

Course
Meadow Branch rises in Delmar, Delaware and then flows northwest and north into Little Creek about 2 miles south of Laurel.

Watershed
Meadow Branch drains  of area, receives about 44.9 in/year of precipitation, has a topographic wetness index of 767.30 and is about 10% forested.

See also
List of Delaware rivers

References

Rivers of Delaware
Rivers of Sussex County, Delaware
Tributaries of the Nanticoke River